Yuryevets is the name of several inhabited localities in Russia.

Modern localities

Urban localities
Yuryevets, Ivanovo Oblast, a town in Yuryevetsky District of Ivanovo Oblast

Rural localities
Yuryevets, Dzerzhinsk, Nizhny Novgorod Oblast, a settlement in Babino Selsoviet under the administrative jurisdiction of the city of oblast significance of Dzerzhinsk in Nizhny Novgorod Oblast
Yuryevets, Pavlovsky District, Nizhny Novgorod Oblast, a village in Varezhsky Selsoviet of Pavlovsky District in Nizhny Novgorod Oblast
Yuryevets, Novgorod Oblast, a village in Opechenskoye Settlement of Borovichsky District in Novgorod Oblast
Yuryevets, Vologda Oblast, a village in Domozerovsky Selsoviet of Cherepovetsky District in Vologda Oblast

Abolished inhabited localities
Yuryevets, Vladimir Oblast, a former urban-type settlement in Vladimir Oblast; since 2006—a part of the city of Vladimir